Watchung may refer to:

In geology
Watchung Mountains, a group of three long low ridges in northern New Jersey
Watchung Outliers, six areas of isolated low hills and rock outcrops of volcanic origin in the U.S. states of New York, New Jersey, and Pennsylvania

Other
Watchung, New Jersey, a borough in Somerset County, New Jersey
Watchung Avenue (NJT station)
Watchung Borough Schools
Watchung Conference, a former high school sports association
Watchung Hills Regional High School
Watchung Reservation, a park in Union County, New Jersey